Tsunami, in comics, may refer to:
Tsunami (DC Comics), a character
Tsunami (Marvel Comics),

See also
Tsunami (disambiguation)